Upper Caboolture is a rural locality in the Moreton Bay Region, Queensland, Australia. Formerly a rural area on the fringe of the town of Caboolture, since the 1990s the suburb has become increasingly urbanised.

Geography
Part of the northern boundary of the suburb is marked by the Caboolture River.

The proposed Bruce Highway Western Alternative will pass through Upper Caboolture from south to north.

History
Camp Flat Provisional School opened on 28 January 1878 with 22 girls and 29 boys enrolled. The school was on Caboolture River Road, approx ). On 19 January 1880 it became Camp Flat State School. It was renamed Caboolture Upper State School in 1916 and closed in 1918.

Formerly a rural area on the fringe of the town of Caboolture, since the 1990s the suburb has become increasingly urbanised.

The median age of the Upper Caboolture population was 34 years, 3 years below the national median of 37.  80.1% of people living in Upper Caboolture were born in Australia. The other top responses for country of birth were England 4.3%, New Zealand 4.1%, Philippines 0.7%, Scotland 0.6%, Papua New Guinea 0.5%.  92.3% of people spoke only English at home; the next most common languages were 0.5% Tagalog, 0.3% Hindi, 0.2% Dutch, 0.2% Spanish, 0.2% Tok Pisin (Neomelanesian).

References

External links 

 

Suburbs of Moreton Bay Region
Localities in Queensland